Forcipomyia is a genus of biting midges in the subfamily Forcipomyiinae. Species of the subgenus Lasiohelea suck vertebrate blood. Some species are ectoparasites on larger insects. Other species in the genus are important pollinators of the cacao tree (Theobroma cacao). There are at least 1,000 described species in Forcipomyia.

Subgenera

See also
 List of Forcipomyia species

References 

 Borkent, A. 2011: World species of biting midges (Diptera: Ceratopogonidae).
 Chen, H.; Liu, Y.; Yu, Y. 2012: Two new biting midges of the subfamily Forcipomyiinae Lenz (Diptera: Ceratopogonidae) from China. Zootaxa 3582: 33–36.
 Debenham, M.L. 1987: The biting midge genus Forcipomyia (Diptera: Ceratopogonidae) in the Australasian region (exclusive of New Zealand). I. Introduction, key to subgenera, and the Thyridomyia and Trichohelea groups of subgenera. Invertebrate taxonomy, 1(1): 35-119. 
 Debenham, M.L. 1987: The biting midge genus Forcipomyia (Diptera: Ceratopogonidae) in the Australasian region (exclusive of New Zealand). II. Warmkea and the Caloforcipomyia group of subgenera. Invertebrate taxonomy, 1(2): 167-199. 
 Debenham, M.L. 1987: The biting midge genus Forcipomyia (Diptera: Ceratopogonidae) in the Australasian region (exclusive of New Zealand). III. The subgenera Forcipomyia, s.s., and Lepidohelea. Invertebrate taxonomy, 1(3): 269-350. 
 Debenham, M.L. 1987: The biting midge genus Forcipomyia (Diptera: Ceratopogonidae) in the Australasian region (exclusive of New Zealand). IV. The subgenera allied to Forcipomyia, s.s., and Lepidohelea, and the interrelationships and biogeography of the subgenera of Forcipomyia. Invertebrate taxonomy, 1(6): 631-684. 
 Johannsen, O.A., 1950: A New Pterobosca from Florida with a Key to American Species. Florida Entomologist, 33 (4): 141-144.
 Liu, Y-q.; Chen, H-y.; Yu, Y-x. 2009: A key of Forciomyia [Forcipomyia] (Synthyridomyia) with discription [description] of a new species from China (Diptera: Ceratopogonidae). Sichuan journal of zoology, 28(4): 521-523.
 Liu, J.-H.; Yan, G.; Liu, G.-P.; Hao, B.-S.; Liu, Z.-J.; Yu, Y.-X. 2001: Forcipomyiinae of China (Diptera: Ceratopogonidae) II. The genus Forcipomyia Meigen. Fauna of China, 3: 1-256. 
 Marino, P.I.; Spinelli, G.R. 2008: Biting midges of the Forcipomyia (Forcipomyia) argenteola group in southern South America, with description of a new species and a key to the Neotropical species (Diptera: Ceratopogonidae). International journal of tropical biology and conservation, 56(2): 789-794.
 Meigen, J. 1818. Systematische Beschreibung der bekannten europäischen zweiflügeligen Insekten 1, v-xii, xxxvi + 1-332. Friedrich Wilhelm Forstmann, Aachen.
 Saha, P.K.; Kumar Dasgupta, S.; Gangopadhyay, D.; Mukherjee, T.K. 2009: A morphotaxonomic study of the Indian species of Forcipomyia Meigen biting midges (Diptera: Ceratopogonidae). Records of the Zoological Survey of India occasional paper, (299)  
 Sun, H.; Ke, M.-J.; Li, S.-X.; Li, L.-Y.; Yu, Y.-x. 2009: Biting midges (Diptera: Ceratopogonidae) from Zhuhai, China. New species and new record of the genus Forcipomyia Miegen. Acta Parasitology et Medica Entomologica Sinica, 16(2): 104-106. 
 Szadziewski, R., 1988: Biting midges (Diptera, Ceratopogonidae) from Baltic amber. Polskie pismo entomologiczne, 58(1): 3-283.
 Szadziewski, R., 1990: Biting midges (Insecta: Diptera: Ceratopogonidae) from Sakhalin amber. Prace Muzeum Ziemi, 41: 77-81.
 Szadziewski, R., 1993: Biting midges (Diptera, Ceratopogonidae) from Miocene Saxonian amber. Acta zoologica cracoviensia, 35(3): 603-656.
 Szadziewski, R. & Sonntag, E., 2013: A new species of Forcipomyia from Paleocene Sakhalin amber (Diptera: Ceratopogonidae). Polish Journal of Entomology, 82 (1): 59-62, 
 Yu, Y. et al. 2005: Ceratopogonidae of China: Insecta, Diptera. Volume I. Military Medical Science Press, Beijing.
 Yu, Y.-x.; Song, F.-C. 2008: A new subgenus, two new species of Forcipomyia from China (Diptera, Ceratopogonidae). Acta zootaxonomica sinica, 33(4): 793-795.

External links 
 

Ceratopogonidae
Chironomoidea genera
Articles containing video clips
Taxa named by Johann Wilhelm Meigen